Anita Belle Colton (October 18, 1919 – November 23, 2006), known professionally as Anita O'Day, was an American jazz singer and self proclaimed “song stylist” widely admired for her sense of rhythm and dynamics, and her early big band appearances that shattered the traditional image of the "girl singer". Refusing to pander to any female stereotype, O'Day presented herself as a "hip" jazz musician, wearing a band jacket and skirt as opposed to an evening gown. She changed her surname from Colton to O'Day, pig Latin for "dough", slang for money.

Early career
Anita Belle Colton (who later took the surname "O'Day") was born to Irish parents, James and Gladys M. (née Gill) Colton in Kansas City, Missouri, and raised in Chicago, Illinois, during the Great Depression. Colton took the first chance to leave her unhappy home when, at age 14, she became a contestant in the popular Walk-a-thons as a dancer. She toured with the Walk-a-thons circuits for two years, occasionally being called upon to sing. In 1934, she began touring the Midwest as a marathon dance contestant.

In 1936, she left the endurance contests, determined to become a professional singer. She started out as a chorus girl in such Uptown venues as the Celebrity Club and the Vanity Fair, and then found work as a singer and waitress at the Ball of Fire, the Vialago, and the Planet Mars. At the Vialago, O'Day met the drummer Don Carter, who introduced her to music theory; they wed in 1937. Her first big break came in 1938 when Down Beat editor Carl Cons hired her to work at his new club at 222 North State Street, the Off-Beat, which became a popular hangout for musicians. Also performing at the Off-Beat was the Max Miller Quartet, which backed O'Day for the first ten days of her stay there. While performing at the Off Beat, she met Gene Krupa, who promised to call her if Irene Daye, then his vocalist, ever left his band. In 1939, O'Day was hired as vocalist for Miller's Quartet, which had a stay at the Three Deuces club in Chicago.

Work with Krupa, Herman, and Kenton
The call from Krupa came in early 1941. Of the 34 sides she recorded with Krupa, it was "Let Me Off Uptown", a novelty duet with Roy Eldridge, that became her first big hit. The same year, DownBeat named O'Day "New Star of the Year". In 1942, she appeared with the Krupa band in two "soundies" (short musical films originally made for jukeboxes), singing "Thanks for the Boogie Ride" and "Let Me Off Uptown". The same year, DownBeat magazine readers voted her into the top five big band singers. O'Day came in fourth, with Helen O'Connell first, Helen Forrest second, Billie Holiday third, and Dinah Shore fifth. O'Day married golf professional and jazz fan, Carl Hoff, in 1942.

When Krupa's band broke up, after he was arrested in 1943 for marijuana possession, O'Day joined Woody Herman for a month-long gig at the Hollywood Palladium, followed by two weeks at the Orpheum. Unwilling to tour with another big band, she left Herman after the Orpheum engagement, and finished out the year as a solo artist. Despite her initial misgivings about the compatibility of their musical styles, she joined Stan Kenton's band in April 1944. During her 11 months with Kenton, O'Day recorded 21 sides, both transcription and commercial, and appeared in a Universal Pictures short Artistry in Rhythm (1944).  "And Her Tears Flowed Like Wine" (1944) became a huge seller, and put Kenton's band on the map. She also appeared in one soundie with Kenton, performing "I'm Going Mad for a Pad" and "Tabby the Cat". O'Day later said "My time with Stanley helped nurture and cultivate my innate sense of chord structure." In 1945, she rejoined Krupa's band and stayed almost a year. The reunion yielded only 10 sides. After leaving Krupa late in 1946, O'Day again became a solo artist.

Post-war work and drug arrests
During the late 1940s, O'Day was trying to achieve popular success without sacrificing her identity as a jazz singer. During this period she recorded two dozen sides, mostly for small labels. Among the more notable recordings from this time are "Hi Ho Trailus Boot Whip", "Key Largo", "How High the Moon", "I Told Ya I Love Ya, Now Get Out", and "Malaguena". While living with husband Carl Hoff in Los Angeles in March 1947, two undercover policemen came to their home, during a party at which Dizzy Gillespie was playing from the branches of a tree in their front yard. They found a small bag of marijuana, for which Anita and Carl were arrested. On August 11, Judge Harold B. Landreth found them guilty, and handed down 90-day sentences. After her jail stint, she performed with Woody Herman's Herd and the Stan Kenton Artistry In Rhythm Orchestra. Her career was back on the upswing in September 1948 when she sang with Count Basie at the Royal Roost in New York City, resulting in five airchecks. What secured O'Day's place in the jazz pantheon, however, were the 17 albums she recorded for Norman Granz's Norgran and Verve labels between 1952 and 1962.

Her first album, Anita O'Day Sings Jazz (reissued as The Lady Is a Tramp), was recorded in 1952 for the newly established Norgran Records (it was also the label's first LP). The album was a critical success and boosted her popularity. In February 1953, she was in court again for another marijuana charge, this time for smoking a joint while riding in a car. The case was dismissed by a jury for lack of evidence, but while awaiting her trial, O'Day was introduced to sniffing heroin by Harry the Hipster. She had switched from marijuana to alcohol after her second arrest, and her first thought on feeling the effects of heroin was, "Oh good, now I don't have to drink." Within a month, she allegedly was framed on a heroin charge and was facing six years in prison. Soon after her release from jail on February 25, 1954, she began work on her second album, Songs by Anita O'Day (reissued as An Evening with Anita O'Day). She recorded steadily throughout the 1950s, accompanied by small combos and big bands. In person, O'Day generally was backed by a trio that included John Poole, the drummer with whom she would work for the next 40 years.

As a live performer, O'Day began performing in festivals and concerts with musicians such as Louis Armstrong, Oscar Peterson, Dinah Washington, George Shearing, Cal Tjader and Thelonious Monk. She appeared in the documentary Jazz on a Summer's Day, filmed at the 1958 Newport Jazz Festival, which increased her popularity. She admitted later that she was probably high on heroin during the concert.  

The following year, O'Day made a cameo appearance in The Gene Krupa Story, singing "Memories of You". Late in 1959, she toured Europe with Benny Goodman to great personal acclaim. O'Day wrote in her 1981 autobiography that when Goodman's attempts to upstage her failed to diminish the audience's enthusiasm, he cut all but two of her numbers from the show.

O'Day went back to touring as a solo artist and appeared on such TV specials as the Timex All-Star Jazz Show and The Swingin' Years hosted by Ronald Reagan. She recorded infrequently after the expiration of her Verve contract in 1962, and her career seemed over when she nearly died of a heroin overdose in 1968. During this time, her working trio included Chicagoan George Finley on drums, father of performance artist Karen Finley. After kicking the habit, she made a comeback at the 1970 Berlin Jazz Festival. She also appeared in the films Zig Zag a.k.a. False Witness with George Kennedy (1970) and The Outfit (1974) with Robert Duvall. She resumed making live and studio albums under the new management of Alan Eichler, many recorded in Japan, and several were released on Emily Records, owned by Anita O'Day and John Poole. Emily Records changed its name to Emily Productions, now owned by Elaine Poole, and they are restoring O'Day's live and studio archives from before, during, and after the Emily years under the Emily Productions label. Jonathan Poole trained for audio engineering under John Jacobson (Casino-Scorsese, Imagine Dragons) to remaster previously unusable content due to a host of imperfections that can now be corrected with today's technology.

Memoir and later life
In November 1980, she was a headliner along with Clark Terry, Lionel Hampton and Ramsey Lewis, during the opening two-week ceremony performances celebrating the short-lived resurgence of the Blue Note Lounge at the Marriott O'Hare Hotel near Chicago. O'Day spoke candidly about her drug addiction in her 1981 memoir High Times, Hard Times, which led to a string of TV appearances on 60 Minutes, The Tonight Show Starring Johnny Carson, The Today Show with Bryant Gumbel, The Dick Cavett Show, Over Easy with Hugh Downs, The Tomorrow Show with Tom Snyder, and several others. She toured Europe and performed a 50th Anniversary Concert (1985) at Carnegie Hall, which resulted in the (2010) release of Anita O'Day – Big Band at Carnegie Hall (Emily Productions).

Following a life-threatening fall down a staircase at the end of 1996, she made a miraculous comeback in 1999, resuming her career with the help of long-time manager Alan Eichler. In 2005, her version of the standard "Sing, Sing, Sing" was remixed by RSL and was included in the compilation album Verve Remixed 3. The following year, she released Indestructible!, her first album in 13 years and her last studio album. During this period pianist John Colianni was her accompanist for numerous club appearances and special gigs (Colianni also plays on Indestructible!).

One of her better known late-career audio performances is "Is You Is or Is You Ain't My Baby", which opens the film Shortbus (2006) by John Cameron Mitchell.

The feature-length documentary Anita O'Day: The Life of a Jazz Singer, directed by Robbie Cavolina and Ian McCrudden, premiered at the Tribeca Film Festival on April 30, 2007.

In November 2006, Robbie Cavolina (her last manager) entered her into a West Hollywood convalescent hospital while she recovered from pneumonia. Two days before her death, she had demanded to be released from the hospital. On Thanksgiving Day, November 23, 2006, at age 87, O'Day died in her sleep. The official cause of death was cardiac arrest.

Style
O'Day cited Martha Raye as the primary influence on her vocal style, also expressing admiration for Mildred Bailey, Ella Fitzgerald, and Billie Holiday. She always maintained that the accidental excision of her uvula during a childhood tonsillectomy left her incapable of vibrato, and unable to maintain long phrases. That botched operation, she claimed, forced her to develop a more percussive style based on short notes and rhythmic drive. However, when she was in good voice she could stretch long notes with strong crescendos and a telescoping vibrato, e.g. her live version of "Sweet Georgia Brown" at the 1958 Newport Jazz Festival, captured in Bert Stern's film Jazz on a Summer's Day.

Discography

Filmography

Features
The Gene Krupa Story (1959) - Herself
Zig Zag (1970) - Sheila Mangan
The Outfit (1973) - Herself
Shortbus (2006)

Documentaries
Jazz on a Summer's Day (1959)
Anita O'Day - Live at Ronnie Scott's (2006)
Anita O'Day: The Life of a Jazz Singer (2007)
Live in Tokyo '63 (2007)
Jazz Icons (2009)

References

External links

Anita O'Day at Jazz Profiles

American jazz singers
1919 births
2006 deaths
American women jazz singers
Bebop singers
Big band singers
Swing singers
Torch singers
Traditional pop music singers
West Coast jazz singers
Jazz musicians from California
Singers from Chicago
Singers from California
20th-century American actresses
21st-century American actresses
20th-century American singers
21st-century American singers
20th-century American women singers
21st-century American women singers
Jazz musicians from Illinois